Francisco Antonio Fraile García (born 19 September 1948) is a Mexican politician affiliated with the National Action Party. As of 2014 he served as Senator of the LVIII and LIX Legislatures of the Mexican Congress representing Puebla. He also served as Deputy during the LX Legislature.

References

1948 births
Living people
Politicians from Oaxaca
Members of the Senate of the Republic (Mexico)
Members of the Chamber of Deputies (Mexico)
Members of the Congress of Puebla
National Action Party (Mexico) politicians
20th-century Mexican politicians
21st-century Mexican politicians
Meritorious Autonomous University of Puebla alumni
People from Huajuapan de León